The Nokia 7370 is a mobile phone made by Nokia, announced in October 2005. It was part of the company's fashion-focused L'Amour Collection and came in two colours: Coffee Brown and Warm Amber. The Nokia 7370 has leather and metallic components and is a "swivel" design that reveals a hidden keypad.

A slightly improved model called Nokia 7373 was released in late 2006 with a 2-megapixel camera rather than 1.3-megapixel, and support for MicroSD up to 2GB.

Specification sheet

References

External links 
 http://www.gsmarena.com/nokia_7370-1331.php

7370
Mobile phones introduced in 2005
Mobile phones with user-replaceable battery